The Revere Journal is the local newspaper for Revere, Massachusetts, United States. It was founded in 1881 with E. H. Pierce as editor, and originally was published as an eight-page publication on Saturdays, with an initial circulation of 2,500.

It is currently published online at reverejournal.com.

References

Newspapers published in Massachusetts
Revere, Massachusetts
Publications established in 1881